Clinton/Bleibler Ranch Aerodrome, formerly , was located  north northwest of Clinton, British Columbia, Canada.

References

Defunct airports in British Columbia
Thompson-Nicola Regional District